Euronext Lisbon is a stock exchange in Lisbon, Portugal.  It is part of Euronext pan-European exchange.

Euronext Lisbon trades equities, public and private bonds, participation bonds, warrants, corporate warrants, investment trust units, and exchange traded funds. The BVL General index is the exchanges official index, and includes all listed shares on the official market. Settlement is T+2. Derivatives include long-term interest rate futures, three-month Lisbor futures, stock index futures and options on the PSI-20 Stock index, and Portuguese stock futures. Trading hours are 8 a.m. to 4:30 p.m., Monday through Friday.

History

The predecessor of the Bolsa de Valores de Lisboa (Lisbon Stock Exchange) was created in 1769 as the Assembleia dos Homens de Negócio (Assembly of Businessmen) in the Commerce Square, Lisbon downtown. In 1891, the Bolsa de Valores do Porto (Oporto Stock Exchange) in Oporto was founded.

After the military coup on April 25, 1974, both the Lisbon and Porto stock exchanges were closed by the revolutionary National Salvation Junta (they would be reopened a couple of years later).

The Euronext Lisbon was formed in 2002 when the shares of Bolsa de Valores de Lisboa e Porto (BVLP) were acquired by Euronext and the exchange was merged into the pan-European exchange. BVLP, the Portuguese exchange, was formed in the 1990s restructuring of the Lisbon Stock Exchange association and the Porto Derivatives Exchange Association.

At the end of 2001, 65 companies were listed on BVLP-regulated markets, representing a market capitalization of Euro 96.1 billion. From January to December 2001, a total of 4.7 million futures and options contracts were traded on the BVLP market.

In 2007, after the merger of Euronext and NYSE, Euronext Lisbon joined the new NYSE Euronext group, the largest corporation operating multiple securities exchanges in the world. In June 2014 Euronext completed an initial public offering making it again a standalone company.

See also
List of European stock exchanges
PSI-20
Portuguese Securities Market Commission
Euronext Amsterdam
Euronext Brussels
Euronext Paris

References

External links
Euronext Lisbon

Financial services companies of Portugal
Economy of Lisbon
Economy of Portugal
Companies based in Lisbon
Financial services companies established in 2002
2002 establishments in Portugal
Lisbon